AL_A, formerly known as Amanda Levete Architects, is a London-based practice formed in 2009 by Stirling Prize-winning architect Amanda Levete CBE.

Practice
AL_A was formed in 2009 following the end of Levete's 20-year partnership with the late Jan Kaplický at Future Systems, where the partnership had completed several internationally recognised buildings including Selfridges' store in Birmingham and the Stirling Prize-winning media centre at Lord's Cricket Ground.

Levete's new company has won a number of important projects and competitions, based on her creative and collaborative approach to architecture.

Projects 
 Exhibition Road Quarter - gallery, entrance and courtyard at the Victoria & Albert Museum, London (2017)
 Central Embassy, Bangkok (2017)
 MAAT, EDP Foundation Cultural Centre, Lisbon (2016)
 Sky Central (2015)
 MPavilion, Melbourne (2015)
 Tincan (2014)
 10 Hills Place, London (2009)
 Spencer Dock Bridge, Dublin (2009)

Awards
 RIBA National Award 2018
Cultural Project of the Year, AJ Awards 2017
Leading Culture Destination Award, Best Museum Architecture 2017
 Iconic Awards, Architecture Best of Best 2017
 Iconic Awards, Practice of the Year 2017
 BCO Awards, Best of Best 2017
 The Chicago Athenaeum International Architecture Award
 European Aluminium Award, Special Jury Prize for Innovation & Design
 World Architecture Festival 2009 Interiors and Fit-Out Prize
 CAB Aluminium in Renovation Award UK, Overall Winner
 CAB Aluminium in Renovation Award UK, Special Prize
 Leading European Arhictects Form, LEAF Awards

References

External links
ala.uk.com

Architecture firms based in London
Design companies established in 2009
Articles with underscores in the title
2009 establishments in England